Electoral district of Bulla was an electoral district of the Legislative Assembly in the Australian state of Victoria. At the redistribution preceding the 1927 election, it was merged with the neighbouring seat of Dalhousie to become Bulla and Dalhousie.

Members for Bulla

Election results

References
Re-Member database Parliament of Victoria

Former electoral districts of Victoria (Australia)
1904 establishments in Australia
1927 disestablishments in Australia